Andrzej Supron (born 22 October 1952 in Warsaw) is a Polish wrestler (Greco-Roman style).

References

 
 Wrestling at Sports123.com
 

1952 births
Living people
Olympic silver medalists for Poland
Olympic wrestlers of Poland
Wrestlers at the 1972 Summer Olympics
Wrestlers at the 1976 Summer Olympics
Wrestlers at the 1980 Summer Olympics
Polish male sport wrestlers
Olympic medalists in wrestling
Sportspeople from Warsaw
Medalists at the 1980 Summer Olympics
World Wrestling Championships medalists
European Wrestling Championships medalists
20th-century Polish people
21st-century Polish people